Villamizar is a surname. Notable people with the surname include:

Alberto Villamizar (1944–2007), Colombian politician and diplomat
Jorge Villamizar (born 1970), Colombian musician, singer, and composer
Mónica Villamizar, Colombian journalist

Spanish-language surnames